The Graham Avenue Transit Mall is a 9-block transit mall in downtown Winnipeg that is mostly reserved for Winnipeg Transit buses, as well as cyclists and pedestrians.

Having been in the planning stages since the 1970s, Graham Mall was completed in 1995. Today, the Mall sees 1,800 buses and 100,000 transit users every day. It is built mostly of highway-grade concrete and features cobblestone brick at all intersections.

History 

Funding and construction of the Graham Avenue Transit Mall began in 1994, and after two years (1994-95) opened in the summer of 1995.

In recent years, road work around the mall has begun to degrade and is in need of serious maintenance work on concrete and cobblestones to keep the roadway smooth. In early 2019, due to safety concerns, a Transit Inspector Station was constructed at the Cargill Building (eastbound Graham at Garry St.) stop.

Bus routes operating on the Graham Avenue Transit Mall 
Several bus routes travel along the Mall, including:

Major businesses on the Transit Mall 

 Hudson's Bay Co. department store
 Manitoba Hydro
Holy Trinity Anglican Church
 Millennium Library
Winnipeg Police HQ
 Cityplace (shopping centre & offices)
CTV Winnipeg
Canada Life Centre
True North Square
 Winnipeg Square an underground shopping centre
Artis Reit Residential Tower (300 Main), a 42-storey apartment complex
GoodLife Fitness Centre (330 Main)
360 Main
 Cargill Building
 200 Graham Ave.
CDI College
 Royal Winnipeg Ballet School

References

External links 

 YouTube - Graham Avenue Transit Mall (ca. 2012)

Pedestrian malls in Canada
Bus rapid transit
Winnipeg Transit
Downtown Winnipeg